Pavol Sedlák (born 21 November 1979) is a Slovak footballer, who currently plays for SK Schwadorf and also assistant manager in the Slovak giant ŠK Slovan Bratislava. His former clubs were MŠK Rimavská Sobota and ŠK Slovan Bratislava. He previously played for FK DAC 1904 Dunajská Streda. He is a midfielder with a lot of international experience. He is well known for his dribbling ability and super strong shots from medium distances. Together with Samuel Slovák, he is one of the leaders inside the squad of the club.

He previously played for Turkish Süper Lig club Gaziantepspor, Çaykur Rizespor, 1. FC Brno, Dukla Banská Bystrica, FC Rimavská Sobota and Slovan Bratislava.

External links
Profile on Slovan website

1979 births
Living people
Association football midfielders
Slovak footballers
Slovak expatriate footballers
Slovak Super Liga players
Süper Lig players
Çaykur Rizespor footballers
FC Zbrojovka Brno players
FK Inter Bratislava players
FK Dukla Banská Bystrica players
FC DAC 1904 Dunajská Streda players
MŠK Rimavská Sobota players
ŠK Slovan Bratislava players
Slovakia international footballers
Slovakia under-21 international footballers
Expatriate footballers in Turkey
Footballers from Bratislava